Suradet Klankhum simply known as Art, is a Thai professional footballer who plays as a left winger.

References

External links

fourfourtwo.com

1996 births
Living people
Suradet Klankhum
Suradet Klankhum
Association football defenders
Association football midfielders
Suradet Klankhum
Suradet Klankhum
Suradet Klankhum